The S8 is a regional railway line of the S-Bahn Zürich on the Zürcher Verkehrsverbund (ZVV), Zürich transportation network, and is one of the network's lines connecting the cantons of Zürich and Schwyz.

Route 
 

The line runs from Winterthur via Oerlikon and the Weinberg Tunnel to Zürich Hauptbahnhof and continues on the left shore of Lake Zurich (over the Lake Zürich left-bank railway line) to Pfäffikon (SZ).

The line's overnight service (SN8), operating on weekends after midnight, runs between Zürich HB and Lachen (SZ).

Stations 
 Winterthur
 Effretikon
 Dietlikon
 Wallisellen
 Zurich Oerlikon
 Zurich Hauptbahnhof
 Zurich Wiedikon
 Zurich Enge
 Zurich Wollishofen
 Kilchberg
 Rüschlikon
 Thalwil
 Oberrieden
 Horgen
 Au ZH
 Wädenswil
 Richterswil
 Bäch
 Freienbach SBB
 Pfäffikon (SZ)

Rolling stock 

 most services are operated with RABe 514 class trains.

Scheduling 
The train frequency on the S8 is usually one train every 30 minutes and the trip takes 68 minutes.

History 
Originally, the S8 operated between Zürich Oerlikon and Zürich Hauptbahnhof (Zurich main station) via  (through the Wipkingen Tunnel). The S8 reversed directions at Zurich main station. With the opening of the Weinberg Tunnel on 15 June 2014 and simultaneous timetable change, the route was changed to its current state.

See also 

 Rail transport in Switzerland
 Trams in Zürich

References 

 ZVV official website: Routes & zones

Zürich S-Bahn lines
Canton of Schwyz
Transport in Thurgau
Transport in the canton of Zürich